Melton West is a suburb in Melbourne, Victoria, Australia,  west of Melbourne's Central Business District, located within the City of Melton local government area. Melton West recorded a population of 8,784 at the 2021 census.

Melton West Post Office opened on 1 September 1994.

See also
 Melton Region
 Melton railway station

References

Suburbs of Melbourne
Suburbs of the City of Melton